Kathryn Maitland  is a British paediatrician who is professor of infectious diseases at Imperial College London, director of the ICCARE Centre at the Institute of Global Health Innovation and an Honorary Fellow at Medical Research Council Clinical Trials Unit, University College, London. Since 2000 she has been based at the KEMRI-Wellcome Trust Research Programme, in Kilifi, Kenya.

Early life and education 
Maitland attended school in Appleton, Cheshire. Maitland completed her undergraduate degree in medicine at the St Bartholomew’s Medical School in 1986. She specialises in paediatrics, global health and clinical trials.

Research and career 
Maitland worked as a clinician scientist co-managing a project of field-based longitudinal epidemiology studies on the Pacific islands of Vanuatu, working with Professor Sir David Weatherall. The work investigated malaria parasite species interactions and host protection by alpha thalassaemia. Since 2000, Maitland has been based full-time in East Africa, leading a research group studying the impact of effective emergency care on childhood mortality.

Maitland was the principal investigator on the FEAST trial. The trial demonstrated that fluid boluses resulted in increased mortality in African children with severe febrile illness and excess mortality was largely a result of cardio-vascular collapse. The paper reporting the FEAST trial won the 2012 BMJ Research Paper of the Year. Her group completed the multicentre TRACT trial which tested two transfusion and treatment strategies  in nearly 4000 children in Africa that aimed to reduce deaths and illness those hospitalised with severe anaemia, providing randomised evidence for transfusion management.  Other aspects of her research portfolio include clinical studies and trials in severe malaria, severe malnutrition and oxygen and respiratory support trial in children hospitalised with severe pneumonia.

Maitland  was elected to the Academy of Medical Sciences (United Kingdom) in 2016. She was appointed Officer of the Order of the British Empire (OBE) in the 2022 Birthday Honours for services to medical science.

Selected publications

References

External links
PubMed search for Kath Maitland

Year of birth missing (living people)
Living people
Fellows of the Academy of Medical Sciences (United Kingdom)
Academics of Imperial College London
British paediatricians
Officers of the Order of the British Empire
British infectious disease physicians
Alumni of the Medical College of St Bartholomew's Hospital
British women medical doctors